Reece Steven Antoniye Mitchell (born 19 September 1995) is an English footballer who plays as a winger for Víkingur Ólafsvík.

Club career
Mitchell joined Chelsea's academy in 2005 as an under-11 and went on to make his under-18 debut as a 15-year old. He went on to play for the club's development squad between 2014 and 2016.

On 29 June 2016, Mitchell rejected a new deal with Chelsea, in order to join League One side Chesterfield on a two-year deal. On 9 August 2016, Mitchell made his professional debut in a 3–1 defeat in an EFL Cup tie against Rochdale, playing 64 minutes before being replaced by Curtis Morrison. Four days later, Mitchell went on to make his Football League debut in a 3–1 victory over Swindon Town, replacing Jay O'Shea with eight minutes remaining. He scored his first senior goal against the same club on 4 March 2017 in a 1–0 victory for the Spireites. He left the club by mutual consent in January 2018.

On 10 January 2018, Mitchell signed for National League club Torquay United. He went onto appear just twice for Torquay, before leaving at the end of his contract in June 2018.

He was released by Torquay at the end of the 2017–18 season.

In the summer of 2018, Mitchell joined National League South side Wealdstone and later had loan spells with Hendon and Wingate & Finchley. He finished the season with Farnborough before joining Haringey Borough and later rejoining Hendon in October 2018 on dual registration.

In January 2020, Mitchell joined Belgian Second Amateur Division side KVK Westhoek.

In October 2021, Mitchell joined Isthmian League South Central Division side Bracknell Town.

In January 2022, Mitchell headed abroad again, this time to Iceland to join newly-relegated 2. deild karla side Víkingur Ólafsvík.

Career statistics

References

External links

1995 births
Living people
Footballers from Westminster
Association football wingers
English footballers
Chelsea F.C. players
Chesterfield F.C. players
Torquay United F.C. players
Hendon F.C. players
Wealdstone F.C. players
Wingate & Finchley F.C. players
Farnborough F.C. players
Haringey Borough F.C. players
Bracknell Town F.C. players
Ungmennafélagið Víkingur players
English Football League players
National League (English football) players
Isthmian League players
2. deild karla players
English expatriate footballers
Expatriate footballers in Belgium
English expatriate sportspeople in Belgium
Expatriate footballers in Iceland
English expatriate sportspeople in Iceland